We Invented the Remix is a remix compilation by P. Diddy & The Bad Boy Family, released on May 14, 2002. It features remixes of hit singles by artists from P. Diddy's Bad Boy Records record label. The album reached number one of the U.S. Billboard 200 albums chart for a week and was later certified Platinum for shipments of over one million copies. The album sold 256,000 copies in its first week. The album also reached number 17 on the UK Albums Chart. The album featured the hit singles "I Need a Girl (Part 1)", which reached number two in the U.S., and "I Need a Girl (Part 2)", which reached number four, a rare occurrence of both parts of the same song both becoming big hits. This was the last album Bad Boy would release under the Arista Records label.

Critical reception

Jason Birchmeier of AllMusic praised the album for crafting a collection of top-notch producers and guest artists to create sure-fire hits that are better than those from The Saga Continues..., concluding that "As a result, We Invented the Remix confirms Combs' return to the top of the urban music world after a few years of struggle." Wise Q of HipHopDX also praised the tracks for the producers and guest artists that come up with their own interpretation but questioned if Diddy can keep his remix formula going without losing any creative steam. Steve 'Flash' Juon of RapReviews said that despite great remixes of "Special Delivery" and "I Need a Girl", he criticized P. Diddy's involvement on the album for making terrible choices to songs that were both unoriginal and pointless, concluding that "If anything it proves that some songs DON'T need a remix, and even those that do should be given better treatment than the selection was here. If you can't find the album on sale or at a comparable price it's just not a good investment. The only thing P. Diddy "Invented" here was a mediocre album."

Track listing

Charts

Weekly charts

Year-end charts

Certifications

References

External links
We Invented the Remix lyrics

2002 remix albums
Sean Combs albums
Bad Boy Records remix albums
Albums produced by Buckwild
Albums produced by Sean Combs
Albums produced by Irv Gotti